Cheng Yong (born 1983 in Yingkou, Liaoning Province) is a contemporary Chinese painter based in Shenyang, North-East China.  He graduated from Lu Xun Academy of Fine Arts. He lives and works in Shenyang, China.

Cheng Yong claims he creates art through personal perception, deconstructing the real and rational life and reconstructing it in his paintings so to suit the purpose of his art. He prefers to assemble, into an imagination-evoking illusory, situations and images from different times and spaces, and combine aspects of the old-fashioned and the fashion which are often irrelevant to or even oppose mutually. He attempts to express both the illusory and tangible, both the false and true, and has tried to created a span in time and space to generate imagination, allowing the audience to drift between the illusion and reality, and hopes the audience reaches the inner unity between the mental and the objective images.

Male protagonists in Cheng's paintings are mainly the artist himself, while female protagonists represent the image of the artist's wife usually standing, lying down, gazing at oneself, or at the viewer. Cheng uses the portrayed characters in an attempt to interact silently with viewers in a subtle manner. Cheng often reflects upon himself just as one does in front of a mirror, and by so doing he attempts to perceive and explore his own identity and existence while trying to convey his feelings on the detachment and loneliness of the general public in the digital era.

Art Review
Merging between classical Realism and Eastern Impressionism 
Cheng's oil paintings express the traditional ambience prevalent in Chinese paintings. Recently, Cheng employed skills such as gaps, negative-space and metaphors, transforming the appearance of an Eastern ambience into a more traditional spirit found  in the Chinese culture. Just as Cheng said in his self-narrative, "I have endeavored to connect contemporary cultural phenomenon with local traditions in the past years to merge the two into one. This integration has repeatedly occurred in my works because I firmly believe that it is this kind of spiritual transcendence that will move and resonate with viewers. In turn, oil painting, originally a Western art, will now become a form of art which expresses one's thoughts and emotions."

Cheng's perspective towards culture identity sets him apart from his counterparts. Different from traditional Western paintings, Cheng's works showcase his mastery of Realism and his subtle ways of expression, while elements integrating the past and the present, as well as the juxtaposition of conflict and harmony are manifested. These qualities accentuate the Cheng's uniqueness among the young generation of artists. Cheng's recent works Ending．Starting and Chinese Classic-Monkey on the Horse are both sophisticated interpretations of the spirit of Chinese culture. Cheng selected themes representing Chinese philosophy. The overall image of his paintings paid homage to Chinese calligraphy, as they included blank-leaving techniques, a new artistic style in contemporary oil painting. Images of Cheng's paintings include classical elements, while real characters such as the artist himself or his wife were also portrayed. Cheng's ingenuity connects various elements representing ancient and contemporary cultures, creating an intriguing contrast between the past and the present.

He unfolds his life with realist oil paintings, while his solid realistic skills bring his artworks more convincing. He says in his autobiography, "For the past few years, I have been trying hard to combine the modern cultural phenomenon with local traditional culture into a whole disposition, which is common in my artworks because I consider it an essence beyond the paintings and sympathetic to the audiences. In this way, I take the oil painting from a western art form into expression of my own way of thinking and feeling." It is the"essence beyond the paintings" that makes his paintings touching. After many years of study, his painting is not the superior technique, but the aesthetics and spirits extracted from it. The seemingly simple expression is actually punching us with the sense of loneliness, anxiety and hesitation.

Exhibitions
Solo Exhibition :
2010  "Morning Glory" Exhibition of Cheng Yong at 798 Mountain Art & Frank Lin Art Center
2011    China International Gallery Exposition 2011-Young Asian Artists Solo Shows

Group Exhibition :
2012  Emerging Artists from the North II Mountain Art Beijing & Frank Lin Art Center, Beijing
2012  The Familiar Strangers——Portraits Exhibition,Mountain Art Beijing & Frank Lin Art Center, Beijing
2012  Emerging Artists from North II, Pata Gallery, Shanghai
2011  "Made in China-New Chinese Contemporary Art Scene" Mountain Art Beijing & Frank Lin Art Center
2011  "Made in China-New Chinese Contemporary Art Scene" National Dr.Sun Yat-sen Memorial Hall,Taipei
2010  " Emerging Artists from the North" Mountain Art Beijing & Frank Lin Art Center
2010  "Now Asian Artists" 2010 Busan Biennale
2009  "10 Years of Luxun Academy of Fine Art" Works From the Graduated Student at Luxun Academy of Fine Art
2009   11th National Art Exhibition, at Museum of Industrial Art
2009  "North!" Contemporary Young Artist at Weilan Art Museum, Shenyang.
2008  "Go China" Contemporary Chinese Artist at 798 Mountain Art & Frank Lin Art Center
2007  "Invisible Dust" participate in the Chinese Contemporary Masters Exhibition at the Beijing Capital Museum
2006  "Interaction of Different Realms" participate in the College Cup Art Exhibition
2006  "Web"and others participated in the exhibition for Luo Zhongli Art Scholarship
2005  "Red Carpet" participate in the 1st Annual Liaoning Undergraduate Artist Show at Luxun Academy of Fine Art
2005  "Time Goes By" participate in the 1st Annual Undergrate Artist Show at Beijing World Art Museum
2005  "All About Design and Space" participate in the Biennial Chengdu Art Exhibition at Chengdu Modern Art Museum
2004  "Pond" participate in the 10th annual oil painting exhibition at Liaoning Exhibition Center
2004  "Melancholy" participate in the 5th Annual Youth Art Festival at Luxun Academy of Fine Art

Notes and references

External links
Cheng Yong on Artnet
 http://www.artnet.com/artists/cheng-yong-2/
Cheng Yong on ArtlinkArt
http://www.artlinkart.com/en/artist/overview/ea4axwqq
Morning Glory-Cheng Yong's solo exhibition on Artnet
http://www.artnet.com/galleries/Exhibitions.asp?gid=425502446&cid=193095
Cheng Yong in CIGE 2011 on 99ys.com
http://news.99ys.com/20110421/article--110421--62219_6.shtml

1983 births
Living people
Painters from Liaoning
People from Yingkou